Bédel Moyimbouabéka (born 8 November 1977) is a Congolese footballer. He played in 22 matches for the Congo national football team from 1995 to 2001. He was also named in Congo's squad for the 2000 African Cup of Nations tournament.

References

1977 births
Living people
Republic of the Congo footballers
Republic of the Congo international footballers
2000 African Cup of Nations players
Association football defenders
Sportspeople from Brazzaville